Silviu Stănculescu (24 January 1932 - 23 October 1998) was a Romanian actor. He appeared in more than forty films from 1960 to 1998.

Selected filmography

References

External links 

1932 births
1998 deaths
Actors from Timișoara
Romanian male film actors